Therese Shaheen (夏馨), a businesswoman and entrepreneur, was Chairman and Managing Director of the American Institute in Taiwan (AIT) from 2002 to 2004. She founded in 1987 an investment and technology development company that focused on emerging economies in Asia. Over the years, her company has had offices in Seoul, Tokyo, Taipei, Beijing, and other Asian capitals.  With the authorization of Taiwan Relations Act, in 2002, she was tapped by President George W. Bush to serve as the first woman Chairman of the American Institute in Taiwan. She served during an important period in U.S.–PRC–Taiwan history, and was seen as a forceful representative of the President and the United States.

After the Taiwan elections in March 2004, Shaheen resigned her position to return to her private sector businesses. She has served as an Adjunct Fellow at the American Enterprise Institute, and remains a popular figure in Taiwan for her outspoken support of the island's commitment to freedom and self-government. Shaheen is a contributor to National Review and publishes and speaks frequently about Asia economic issues. She earned her bachelor's degree from the Georgetown University School of Foreign Service and her Master's in International Public Policy from Johns Hopkins School of Advanced International Studies in Washington, DC.

References

American women diplomats
American diplomats
Walsh School of Foreign Service alumni
Paul H. Nitze School of Advanced International Studies alumni
Johns Hopkins University alumni
Year of birth missing (living people)
Living people
Chairs of the American Institute in Taiwan
21st-century American women